Development and Psychopathology is a peer-reviewed medical journal that covers research which addresses the interrelationship of typical and atypical psychological development in children and adults. It was established in 1989 and is published by Cambridge University Press. According to the Journal Citation Reports, the journal has a 2017 impact factor of 4.357.

References

External links 
 

Cambridge University Press academic journals
English-language journals
Publications established in 1989
Psychiatry journals
Monthly journals
Developmental psychology journals